Domhnall Caomhánach (Domhnall Mac Murchada or Domhnall Caomhánach Mac Murchada, anglicized as Donal Kavanagh) is the ancestor of the Caomhánach line of the Uí Ceinnselaig dynasty and was King of Leinster from 1171 to 1175.  Domhnall was the eldest son of the 12th century King of Leinster, Diarmait Mac Murchada in Ireland.

Domhnall was fostered for his training and education at the monastery of St. Caomhan at Kilcavan in the Barony of Gorey, County Wexford. In an effort to distinguish himself from his other brothers, Domhnall assumed the name Caomhánach (an adjective of the name Caomhan, meaning "of Caomhan", in modern English "of Kevin"). Contrary to usual Irish practice, the name was adopted by his descendants as an inherited surname.

King of Leinster
After the death of his father Diarmait Mac Murchada (English: Dermot McMurrough) in 1171, Domhnall was proclaimed King of Leinster by some clan chiefs, in line with the traditional Brehon law. Domhnall's legitimacy to the title was widely disputed by the Cambro-Norman invaders who viewed that their leader, Strongbow (Richard de Clare, the 2nd Earl of Pembroke), was the legitimate successor due to his marriage to Domhnall's sister Aoife/Eva and that Domhnall's claim was "illegitimate" under Norman law.

In any case, Diarmait had given Leinster as a dowry with Aoife/Eva on her marriage to Strongbow, and there is no record that Domhnall publicly opposed her endowment at the time of her marriage.

In 1175, it is recorded in the Annals of the Kingdom of Ireland that Domhnall was killed by O'Foirtchern and O'Nolan during the Battle of Naas. He is buried near his father Diarmait Mac Murchada in the Cathedral graveyard of Ferns village. After his death, Domhnall was succeeded as King by his grandson Muirchertach, the son of Domhnall Oge Caomhánach.

See also
Kings of Leinster
Diarmait Mac Murchada
Caomhánach

References

1140s births
1175 deaths
12th-century Irish people
Kings of Leinster
12th-century Irish monarchs
MacMorrough Kavanagh dynasty